SegaWorld London was an indoor theme park located inside the London Trocadero in London, England. The venue opened up in September 1996 and operated as a joint-venture between Chorion, the owners of the Trocadero, and Sega. At 110,000 square feet, it was claimed to be the largest indoor theme park in the world. It was Sega's flagship venue in Europe and the first Sega theme park outside of Japan.

The venue struggled with attendance which led to an early exit from Sega in the joint-venture, leading to its owners renting the space to the owners of the nearby Funland arcade which merged together with its existing branch nearby, and remained as such until its permanent closure in 2011.

History

Development
During the early 1990s, Sega grew exponentially, as a result of a successful reinvigoration of their once-fledgling Sega Genesis home console in the United States and Europe and the popularity of the Sonic the Hedgehog mascot character. Additionally, an initially lucrative stream of income had been created by the openings of a number of family-oriented amusement facilities under the name of Sega World, as part of an ongoing initiative by the company to clean up arcades. Starting out in Japan and Taiwan, Sega Worlds eventually appeared in the United Kingdom after the buyout of arcade machine distributors Deith Leisure by Sega's European management. At the same time, the London Trocadero complex, relaunched the previous decade as a shopping centre, was receiving a boost from numerous unrelated video gaming facilities, including the popular Funland amusement arcade,  however its upper floors were still largely vacant after the closure of its previous 1960s tenants.

The Trocadero was originally intended to be the site for a smaller scale Sega amusement venue, scheduled to open shortly after the launch of the then-flagship Sega World centre in Bournemouth during July 1993. This was aborted, with Sega instead opening venues in other London locations like Colindale's Oriental City shopping centre in the following months. However, by January 1995, a new deal had been reached with Trocadero owner Nick Leslau to create a venue under Sega's "Amusement Theme Park" concept, which launched the previous year in Japan with the openings of Osaka ATC Galbo in the Asian Trade Center, Osaka, and the first Joypolis indoor theme park in Shin-Yamashita, Yokohama. The park would contain much of the same interactive attractions released in Japan during the previous years and developed by Sega's AM5 division, including the AS-1 simulator.

Construction began on SegaWorld London in late 1995. Proposed to use 100,000 square feet across the seven unused floors of the Trocadero building, it instigated a large-scale refurbishment of the central shopping atrium itself in the process. At least £45 million was revealed to have been spent on the park's creation, with Sega appointing numerous firms such as Tibbats Associates and RTKL for its design. Anticipation for the opening was created in a number of gaming magazines; Sega staged a number of press events centred around the construction of the centre during 1996. A high-level sponsorship deal was made with Pepsi to sponsor the Trocadero in the weeks leading up to the opening, though this did not benefit Sega directly.

Opening
Initially slated for a Summer 1996 opening, SegaWorld London eventually opened to the public on September 7, 1996, after a private press party event held at the end of the previous month. Launched in the midst of a £1.5 million advertising campaign created by Mustoe Merriman and Motive, the openings were attended by several celebrities, including Robbie Williams, Anneka Rice, and Jarvis Cocker, and covered by numerous magazines and television programmes, with T3 and Newsround among them. The day following the public opening, a second press party was held for ECTS 1996 attendees, which also included the UK launch of Sega's Nights into Dreams video game.

The three launches, particularly the public opening, did not run as planned. Though positive comments were made towards the park's large "Rocket Escalator", the variety of coin-operated arcade machines on offer, and the advanced VR-1 attraction, reception for most other aspects of it was poor. Common problems cited included overly long queue lines (despite Sega stating they would not occur), overpriced entry fees, and a lack of enthusiasm for the supposed "futuractive" attractions on offer - several reviewers noted that one ride, Beast In Darkness, was little more than a haunted house/ghost train ride with no interactivity, nor did any utilise Sega's portfolio of popular intellectual properties in spite of the heavy usage of the Sonic the Hedgehog character as a mascot.

Due to the poor reviews, mismanaged crowd control, and general state of disappointment over what was initially promised by Sega, the opening of SegaWorld London was largely regarded as a PR disaster, denting the brand's once-strong reputation in the United Kingdom and setting an unfortunate precedent for the venue, as well as future endeavours. Subsequently, Sega would open only one more indoor theme park location outside of Japan during the 1990s, Sega World Sydney, despite the touted plans for over 100 locations across the world by the end of the decade under their Amusement Theme Park concept. Others were earmarked, but ultimately never realised, for a number of other European locations, including Paris.

Decline and closure
In response to the criticisms raised in reviews, Sega initially put the majority of the SegaWorld's arcade machines on freeplay in the weeks after opening. However, this model was not profitable, with much of the park's floor space devoted to the cabinets. By the end of the year, admission fees had been cut down from £12 and £10 to £2, taking the arcade machines off freeplay and establishing ticket payments for the park's seven attractions as a result. These did little to turn around fortunes, and by the time the first full year of operations had been completed, its 1.75 million visitor target had not been achieved, and a £1 million loss from running the facility was recorded. Difficulties were also faced in maintaining rides; a number were reported to have broken down in the weeks following the opening.

Further restructuring was required for SegaWorld to run unproblematically, and in December 1997 all admission fees were removed from the park, effectively rendering it a large-scale amusement arcade with rides. Though this improved attendance numbers considerably, with an estimated 4 million visitors in 1998, it did not mean a profit was being made off of the park; indeed, an operating loss of £2 million was recorded during the same year. Other strains on the centre included vandalism concerns, internal distaste for the park's perceived poor working standards, and its close proximity to other London amusement arcades more popular with regular visitors, such as Namco's Wonder Park facility on Great Windmill Street.

Though new Sega arcade releases were consistently location tested and installed exclusively at the venue as a result of its flagship status, few new attractions were installed after the opening. A new 3D IMAX cinema and drop tower ride sponsored by Pepsi renewed tourist interest in the Trocadero.  As part of the original agreements drawn up to create SegaWorld in 1995, Sega were contractually bound to pull out of running the facility if a £3 million profit had not been recorded exactly three years after opening.

In 1999, a Sports Bar, Food concession stand, and Dodgems track were added to the park to increase attention and attendance, but things were still proving to be problematic, and on 7 September 1999, Sega officially announced that they would be pulling out of the SegaWorld joint venture with Chorion, and that beginning on 12 September, Chorion would sub-let SegaWorld's former space to Family Leisure, the operators of Funland in the same venue. Ironically, Family Leisure was established by one of Sega of Europe's original founders, Marty Bromley.

Operations
Taking up 7 floors of the London Trocadero building when launched, SegaWorld London was officially billed as an indoor theme park. Its further 6 attractions and themes backed this up, however unlike a typical theme park, these were not unified under a single concept. In addition, much of the park's attraction was its selection of 400+ coin-operated arcade machines,  spread out across 6 of the floors and placed in a uniform manner, generally in keeping with a floor's theme. Due to its status as a flagship Sega facility, SegaWorld also received numerous games on location test, as well as rarely seen Japanese import cabinets such as Dennou Senki Net Merc and SegaSonic the Hedgehog.

Layout
After entering the Trocadero through its shopping arcade entrance, visitors embarked up the venue's "Rocket Escalator" (Europe's largest above-ground escalator) sited in the middle of the main atrium to access the 7 SegaWorld floors. These would then be navigated through a further series of escalators and travelators, working their way back down to the main atrium of the Trocadero.

Reception - The park's welcoming area, containing information desks, a cloak room, and photo opportunity areas with large statues of the Sonic the Hedgehog mascot character, as well as the entrance for the first attraction, Beast In Darkness.
Combat Zone - Modelled more on a dimly-lit conventional video arcade, with over 50 action games and no attractions.
Race Track - Themed around racing, featuring over 70 driving games and the Aqua Planet attraction. One of Damon Hill's FW15C cars from the 1993 Formula One season was also sited as a photo opportunity.
Flight Deck - Over 20 air combat games (including a Sega R360) and the VR-1: Space Mission attraction, with aviation-themed décor and a decommissioned RAF Harrier jump jet hung from its ceiling.
The Carnival - A brightly-lit arena with over 80 arcade machines, generally prize redemption. Also housed the Segakids area for children, an on-site McDonald's outlet, and the Ghost Hunt attraction, with a set of Dodgems being added for the venue's final year.
Sports Arena - Mad Bazooka and AS-1 attractions contrasted the floor's sporting theme, illustrated with over 90 sports games and a large surfing Sonic the Hedgehog statue. During the park's final year, a sports bar was added into the space formerly occupying the "AS-1" attraction.

A second McDonald's outlet and the on-site Sega Shop were sited directly opposite the exit escalator into the main Trocadero atrium; the latter is believed to have later been moved to the Sports Arena.

Attractions
Though there was no unified theme in SegaWorld, much of its main allure was its pretences of offering "futuractive" rides with interactive elements. In reality, few of the attractions installed at the venue drew upon particularly advanced technology, however most did feature some interactive element.

Post-History

After Family Leisure took over the ex-SegaWorld floors, the company combined them with their existing Funland arcade which was located on the first floor of the complex to create a large seven-floor arcade. Family Leisure previously operated an expansion of Funland in the basement of the Trocadero but this was closed after they took over the ex-SegaWorld floors.

In Late-2000, Family Leisure commissioned Proun to completely refurbish the space with a brand new family-friendly appearance, with a new entrance being added to the first floor (formerly the SegaWorld "exit" and the original portion of Funland), and the addition of more escalators. To fill out the newly expanded space, new additions were made to the ex-SegaWorld floors. Alongside the sports bar and Pool table room on the former "Sports Arena" floor previously added the year prior, a Bowling alley was added with a Wimpy fast-food outlet, which replaced McDonald's. The former "Carnival" became home to several amusement rides, with a Ghost Train (repurposed from the "Ghost Hunters" attraction), Go-Kart track and Breakdance flat ride joining the Dodgems which were also added the year prior.

While the new Funland was deemed to be impressive, the management at Family Leisure was not keen on a large entertainment complex, as the company's other operations were smaller and more compact. With crime rates at the Trocadero increasing, Family Leisure granted planning permission in September 2002 to reduce the size of Funland to only two floors instead of eight, with the ex-SegaWorld entrance being blocked off with a vending machine. The rides at the venue were soon sold off to private owners including the unrelated Funland Hayling Island, who purchased the Breakdance and the nearby Drop Tower.

Despite the downsize, Funland remained the largest arcade in the United Kingdom, and regained a resurgence in the mid-2000s as a central hub for London's then-nascent rhythm game community, with numerous notable events and notable games held at the location.

After the Trocadero's purchase by Criterion Capital in 2005, Family Leisure began conflicting with Criterion over the venue with the latter's aim to convert the Trocadero Centre into a Pod Hotel. In May 2011, the Rocket Escalator that went up to the SegaWorld floors was removed in order to prepare for the conversion of the venue, and eventually, Funland would follow suit in July 2011, after being stripped of its electricity power by Criterion. The remaining Rocket Escalator that went up to the arcade was also removed.

Legacy
SegaWorld London remains one of the largest amusement facilities developed under Sega to date. Though its failure and critical panning can be seen as emblematic of wider problems within the company and the declining arcade industry during the late 1990s, it is looked back on fondly by many visitors and has been the subject of numerous fan works, including videos and articles, in recent years.

See also
Joypolis
Sega World Sydney
GameWorks
London Trocadero
Namco Funscape

External links
Promotional pre-release trailer from 1996
 SegaWorld London homepage (archived)

References

1990s in London
1996 establishments in the United Kingdom
1999 disestablishments in the United Kingdom
Sega amusement parks
Defunct amusement parks in the United Kingdom
Defunct amusement parks in England
Sega
Tourist attractions in London
Video gaming in the United Kingdom